Rudolf Albert Martin Boehm (Böhm) (19 May 1844, in Nördlingen – 19 August 1926, in Bad Kohlgrub) was a German pharmacologist, known for his work in the field of experimental pharmacology.

He studied medicine at the universities of Munich and Würzburg, and in 1868–70 served as an assistant to Franz von Rinecker at the Juliusspital in Würzburg. In 1871 he obtained his habilitation under Adolf Fick, then during the following year was named a professor of pharmacology, dietetics and history of medicine at the University of Dorpat. Later on, he worked as professor of pharmacology at the universities of Marburg (from 1881) and Leipzig (from 1884), where on four separate occasions he was named dean to the medical faculty. During his tenure at Leipzig, he oversaw the construction of its pharmacological institute (1886–88). Today the institute at Leipzig is known as the Rudolf-Boehm-Institut für Pharmakologie und Toxikologie.

His main research dealt with the pharmacological and toxicological properties of substances of plant origin and their effect(s) on the animal organism. He conducted extensive studies on the actions of digitalis, muscarine (a product of certain mushrooms), choline and curare. In 1895 he classified curare into three groups; "calabash curares" (usually taken from the family Loganiaceae, Strychnos species), "tubo curares" (derived from the family Menispermaceae) and "pot curares" (mixed Menispermaceae and Loganiaceae substances). He also performed significant research of carbohydrate metabolism.

Selected works 
 Die Physiologie und Pathologie der Seele (1870); German translation of Henry Maudsley's Physiology and pathology of the mind.
 Studien über Herzgifte, (1871).
 Handbuch der Intoxicationen (with Bernhard Naunyn and Hermann von Boeck), (1876).
 Lehrbuch der allgemeinen und speziellen Arzneiverordnungslehre für Studierende, Ärzte und Apotheker, (1884).
 Das Calebassencurare. Das Topfcurare. Über einige Curarerinden, (1897).
 Physiologische Untersuchungen über den Tod (1912); German translation of Xavier Bichat's Recherches physiologiques sur la vie et la mort.
He was also an editor of the journal Archivs für experimentelle Pathologie und Pharmakologie.

References 

1844 births
1926 deaths
People from Nördlingen
German pharmacologists
Academic staff of Leipzig University
Academic staff of the University of Tartu
Academic staff of the University of Marburg
University of Würzburg alumni